01708 is the national dialling code for Romford in the United Kingdom. The area it serves includes almost all of the London Borough of Havering and some adjacent areas. When STD codes were first introduced, Romford was assigned 0708 and 0402 was used for the rest of the current code area. After a sequence of changes in the early 1990s, culminating with PhONEday, the current 01708 code became active on 16 April 1995. All subscriber numbers within the area code consist of six digits. The code is used at eight telephone exchanges as part a linked numbering scheme. In common with all other British area codes the initial '0' is a trunk prefix that is not required when dialling Romford from abroad.

History
When STD codes were initially assigned, Romford was given the mnemonic code RO8 (corresponding to 708 on the rotary dial), with Hornchurch and the rest of the area using the HO2 (402) code. With the transition to all-figure dialling which ended the practice of representing STD codes with letters in 1966, and including the trunk prefix, these became 0708 and 0402. The 0402 code covered seven exchanges in a linked numbering scheme, with an additional digit for each exchange, as below. Internally, the 0402 code was translated to routing digits by registers to the same string of digits as 0708 plus an additional 8, which corresponded to the 8 in the local code from Romford Group Switching Centre to the local exchange. This technique was used to keep the dialled string down to the 10 digit limit that was imposed (though Stapleford only had 3 digit local numbers and South Ockendon 4 digits and so these could be dialled as 0708 8x xxx as well as the official 0402x xxx / xxxx.)

The two codes operated as a single group for charging purposes in which all calls were priced at local rate. Additionally (and as is usual) calls to and from the adjacent charge groups were charged as local.

The area was adjacent to the London telephone area and formed part of the London Telecommunications Region set up in the 1930s. The Upminster exchange was the last in the London region to convert from manual service in 1970 and the first to use the TXK system. The Stapleford exchange was the last in the region to use the UAX 13 Strowger automatic exchange system. After being decommissioned in 1992 the exchange, including the original building, became a working exhibit at Avoncroft Museum of Historic Buildings.

In common with exchanges in areas adjacent to the London 01 area, local dialling codes were assigned. For example, Romford 5 digit numbers (which began with 2, 4, or 6) could be reached from 01 numbers by dialling 70 (instead of 0708), Romford 6 digit numbers (which began with 75 and were served by Romford South exchange) could be reached by dialling 3 instead of 0708 and Hornchurch numbers (5 digit) could be reached by dialling 49 instead of 04024.

During the 1980s and early 1990s exchanges in the 0402 area gradually transitioned to 0708 and subscriber numbers were standardised at six digits. The 1979/80 code book shows South Ockendon as the first exchange to change code and subscriber numbers. By 1983 the South Ockendon change was shown to be complete and Purfleet numbers were in the process of being amended.

After this was completed the code for the whole area changed on PhONEday in 1995 to 01708. The 0402 code was reused for mobile telephone numbers until it was abandoned again during the Big Number Change in 2000.

Coverage
The code serves almost the whole of the London Borough of Havering in Greater London with exchanges at Romford, Hornchurch, Ingrebourne (in Harold Wood), Rainham and Upminster. There are three exchanges outside the borough in Essex at Purfleet, South Ockendon and Stapleford.

Number allocation
Under the National Telephone Numbering Plan the code operates with the following sub-ranges:

The area code is subject to number conservation and the regulator Ofcom restricts the size of number blocks that are allocated. The area code is expected to run out of subscriber numbers in 2028.

Notes

References

1708
Infrastructure in London
Media and communications in the London Borough of Havering
Thurrock
Epping Forest District
Romford
Telecommunications-related introductions in 1995